= FWSE =

FWSE may mean:

- Famous web search engine, a nickname for Google's internet search engine
- Fast Wide Single-Ended, an implementation of SCSI that uses Fast SCSI, Wide SCSI and Single-Ended electrical layout
- Fixed Wing Single Engine aircraft, a type of aircraft with fixed wings (not a rotorcraft) and one engine; for examples of the type, see Category:Single-engine aircraft
